Antonio De Santis, Totò (17 October 1931 -  4 April 2014) was an Italian poet, famous for his sonnets in Larinese, the dialect of Larino.

Biography
Born in Larino, province of Campobasso, son of Corrado De Santis, owner of cinema of Larino during the years of World War II.
In the early 1950s he moved to Genoa, in Liguria.

Published works
I Viecch-j ditt (2004), The collection of stories of Larino in the Molise.
I Viecch-j ditt 2 (2006)
I Viecch-j ditt 3 (2008)

References

External links 
Larino: The Miracle of the Molise
Artheria Pulsazioni d’Arte - Festival dell’arte di strada 

1931 births
2014 deaths
People from the Province of Campobasso
20th-century Italian poets